The 2016–17 Aruban Division di Honor was the 56th season of the Aruban Division di Honor, the top tier of football in Aruba. The regular season began on 7 October 2016, with Dakota taking a 3–0 win over RCA. The final game of the regular season was on 23 April 2017 with Britannia taking a 1–0 home victory over La Fama. 

The Division di Honor's second stage is the "Caya 4" tournament, where the top two teams qualify for the final and the 2018 CFU Club Championship. The competition began on 12 May and concluded on 9 June 2017. RCA, Britannia, Dakota and Nacional participated in the tournament with RCA and Nacional taking the top two spots after a forfeit by Nacional in their final match was later overturned.

The final uses a modified two-out-of-three format and will begin on 27 June 2017 and conclude in July 2017.

RCA entered the season as the defending champions.

Teams 
There were 10 clubs that competed during the season.

Regular season 
The ten teams were to play each other in a double round robin, for a total of 18 matches, with a mid-season break in December and January. Jong Aruba withdrew from the league during the mid-season break, after 9 out of 18 matches were played. All of their results were annulled, and their remaining fixtures were cancelled.

Table and results

Postseason

Caya 4 
The Caya 4 tournament began on 12 May and concluded on 9 June 2017. The top four teams played six additional games, a home-and-away double round-robin against their three opponents.

Championship 
The top two finishers of the Caya 4 tournament will play in the Championship, which is a best two-out-of-three series. However unlike a typical two-out-of-three series, if a team wins one of the first two matches and the other match is a draw, that team wins the series without playing the third game. This is despite the fact that their opponent could potentially tie the series if a third game were played. The winner also qualifies for the Caribbean Club Shield, the second tier club competition for the Caribbean region for associations without a professional league.

The tournament will be held in June and July 2017.

     

     

Nacional won the Championship 2 matches to 1. Qualified for the Caribbean Club Shield

Relegation playoffs 
The eighth and ninth place finishers played against the second and third place finishers of the second division in a double round-robin to decide who would play in the top tier. First and second place finishers would compete in the 2017–18 Division di Honor, while the third and fourth place finishers would compete in the 2017–18 Division Uno. Before the start of the 2017–18 Division di Honor, Caravel withdrew from the league due to financial reasons and 2016–17 Division Uno champions Real Piedra Plat folded. As a result, La Fama were reprieved of relegation, and Juventud TL were awarded promotion.

Statistics

Top goalscorers

References 

Aruban Division di Honor seasons
Artuba
football
football